In music, Op. 94 stands for Opus number 94. Compositions that are assigned this number include:

 Britten – String Quartet No. 3
 Prokofiev – Flute Sonata
 Prokofiev – Violin Sonata No. 2
 Schumann – Three Romances for Oboe and Piano
 Strauss – Rhadamantus-Klänge